Saint-Aubin is a commune in the Essonne department in Île-de-France in northern France.

Inhabitants of Saint-Aubin are known as Saint-Aubinois.

Research activity
In the neighbourhood of Saclay and Orsay, Saint-Aubin is the home of two sites of the Commissariat à l'énergie atomique (CEA). The synchrotron SOLEIL, a collaboration between CEA and the Centre national de la recherche scientifique (CNRS), is also located here, south of the village.

See also
Communes of the Essonne department

References

External links

Official website 

Mayors of Essonne Association 

Communes of Essonne